Mashqita is a town in northwestern Syria, administratively part of the Latakia Governorate, located north of Latakia. Nearby localities include Ayn al-Bayda, Al-Shamiyah and Burj Islam to the west, al-Bahluliyah to the east and Mushayrafet al-Samouk to the southwest. According to the Syria Central Bureau of Statistics, Mashqita had a population of 2,376 in the 2004 census. Its inhabitants are predominantly Alawites.

Notables 
 Hani al-Rahib, (30 November 1939 – died 6 February 2000) novelist and literary academic.

References

Populated places in Latakia District
Alawite communities in Syria